This is a list of United States ambassadors to the European Union. The formal title of this position is Representative of the United States of America to the European Union, with the rank and status of Ambassador Extraordinary and Plenipotentiary.

Ambassadors to the European Union

See also 
United States Mission to the European Union

Notes 
 Previously representative (beginning in 1959) to several of the pre-EU (European Communities) groups including the European Coal and Steel Community, European Economic Community, and European Atomic Energy Community. First ambassador.
 Title changed from "European Communities" to "European Union" on May 9, 1994.

References

External links 

United States Mission to the European Union

European Union
United States